Rain, Rain .. Come Again is a 2004 Indian Malayalam-language mystery film directed by Jayaraj and written by Sharath Haridasan. The story is set against the backdrop of two competing colleges in Kerala, amidst, a professor who heads a covert Satanic cult tries to lure students. The film features debutants Ajay Jose, Reji V. Nair, Divya Lakshmi, and Asif Khan in principal roles. The songs were composed by Jassie Gift, while the background score was provided by Pravin Mani. The film is noted as it is the first ever Malayalam film centered on theme of Satanism. The movie was a hit at the box office.

Rain, Rain .. Come Again was released in theatres on 8 August 2004. The songs "Themma Themma Themmadikkate" and "Nillu Nillu" were trendsetters among Kerala youth at that time.

Plot

Dinesh, an orphan boy arrives in King Aloysius Men's college which maintains a longstanding rivalry with Queen Agnes Women's college. Agnes college tries to acquire NAAC accreditation, but Dinesh along with Aloysius college authorities spoil the plan. They also spoil the youth festival of their rivals. In retaliation, Agnes college under the leadership of Sree defame the name of Allosyus college by trapping them in a scandal.

Meanwhile, under the leadership of a professor, Satanism slowly extends its influence in the college. The satanists including professor David Andrews, the leader, and Franko begin to lure students into the cult and those who refuse to convert at their usual gathering are killed.

Meanwhile, Franko, who was Daisy's boyfriend befriends Sree, which causes a split between Dinesh and Sree. John finds out about the professor and Franko's deal from Marco Polo, his classmate. Marco Polo reveals his findings to a police officer, who surprisingly is an ally of the Satanists. Marco gets brutally killed by Franko.

Sree is lured into the cult by Franco after the split with Dinesh. Dinesh, enraged over the death of his friend, seeks revenge and goes after the cult members to rescue Sree. In a fight that follows, Prof. David Andrews is subdued and chased to a mountain cliff. He screams out, "Praise Satan" and jumps off the cliff to his death. In the end, Dinesh and Sree unite and is seen celebrating.

Cast
Ajay Jose as Dinesh
Divya Lakshmi as Sree 
Reji V. Nair as Prof. David Andrews
Asif Khan as Franco / Joseph Gordon
Ajay Thomas as Sasi 
Sarath Haridasan as Marco Polo 
Jassie Gift as Jerry 
Kaladharan as Father Kunjukutty 
Prasanth Punnapra as Rajappan 
Thara Thomas as daisy 
Valiyashala Sukumaran as Men's hostel warden 
Chandrika Das as Lady Gaga 
Archana Susheelan as College student
Rasana as College student
Iniya as College student
Vinod Kedamangalam as Bus employee
Unni Shivapal as M. P.

Soundtrack

The film features songs composed by Jassie Gift and distributed by Sony Music Entertainment India Pvt. Ltd. / Johny Sagariga. The background score was done by Pravin Mani. The song "Themma Themma Themmaadikkaatte" was later reused as "Pada Pada Kannada" in the film Shyloo (2011).

Release 
The film was originally scheduled to release on 6 August 2004, but the Thiruvananthapuram Regional Censor Board refused to certify the film citing "excessive violence" and had referred the film to the revising committee. Sify reported that distributors and exhibitors are shocked because "Jayaraj's earlier film 4 The People had more violence and close-up's of hands and legs being chopped off which was passed by the same censors".

Reception
A critic from Sify wrote that "it's hard to find one redeeming factor in this utterly lame brain, stupid film [...] the lead cast of newcomers are all a major let down and technically the film is a big disappointment. All the seven songs in the album sound similar and the picturisation is low brow". The film underperformed at the box office. However, the songs "Themma Themma Themmadikkatte" and "Nillu Nillu" were trendsetters among Kerala youth at that time.

In popular culture
In 2018, the song "Nillu Nillu" (meaning: stop, stop) became viral in the social media application TikTok, with users posting videos of them stopping moving vehicles for dancing in front of it with the song playing in the background. It called the attention of Kerala Police who condemned the act for public nuisance and blocking vehicles on the road.

References

External links
 

2004 films
2000s Malayalam-language films
Films scored by Jassie Gift
Films directed by Jayaraj